Unter falscher Flagge (Under false colors or Under false flag) is the second album of the German punk band Die Toten Hosen.

Track listing
 "Spiel mir das Lied vom Tod" (Play me the song of death; German title for "Once Upon a Time in the West") (Ennio Morricone) − 2:19
 "Liebesspieler" (Love Player) (von Holst, Breitkopf, Frege/Frege) − 2:50
 "Letzte Wache" (Last watch) (von Holst, Breitkopf, Frege, Meurer/Frege) − 3:18
 "Der Abt von Andex" (The abbot of Andex) (Trimpop, Frege, von Holst, Breitkopf/Frege, Meurer) − 3:12
 "Der Mord an Vicky Morgan" (The murder of Vicky Morgan) (Trimpop, Frege, von Holst, Breitkopf, Meurer/Trimpop, Frege, Meurer) − 3:32
 "Im Hafen ist Endstation" (In harbour is the end station) − 4:16
 "Unter falscher Flagge" (Under the wrong flag) (Trimpop, Frege, von Holst, Breitkopf/Trimpop Frege, Meurer/Narrator: Hans Paetsch) − 4:12
 "Sekt oder Selters" ([In] good or bad, lit. Champagne or soda) (Trimpop, Frege, von Holst, Breitkopf, Meurer/Frege) − 3:56
 "Der Schandfleck" (Disgrace) (Frege, von Holst, Breitkopf/Frege) − 2:56
 "Betrunken im Dienst" (Drunk on duty) (Trimpop, Frege, von Holst, Breitkopf, Meurer/Trimpop, Frege, Meurer) − 2:20
 "Shake Hands" (Drafi Deutscher cover) − 2:13
 "Warten auf dich" (Waiting for you) (Trimpop, Frege, von Holst, Breitkopf/Frege) − 3:40
 "Im Hafen ist Endstation 2" − 1:12

2007 remastered anniversary edition bonus tracks
<li> "Spiel mir das Lied vom Tod" – 1:14 (from "Liebesspieler")
<li> "Es ist vorbei" (It's over) (Frege, von Holst/Frege, Meurer, Trimpop) – 2:27 (from "Liebesspieler")
<li> "Till to the Bitter End" (English version of "Bis zum bitteren Ende") (Frege/Frege) – 2:48 (from "Liebesspieler")
<li> "Seafever" (English version of "Reisefieber") (Breitkopf, Frege, von Holst, Meurer, Trimpop/Frege) – 3:38 (from "Liebesspieler")
<li> "Hofgarten" (Court garden) (Breitkopf, von Holst, Meurer/von Holst) – 1:41 (from "Liebesspieler")
<li> "Hip Hop Bommi Bop" (Breitkopf, Frege, von Holst, Meurer, Trimpop/Meurer, Trimpop) – 4:26 (Unter falscher Flagge demo)
<li> "Faust in der Tasche" (Fist in the pocket) (Frege, von Holst/Frege) – 3:55 (from The Battle of the Bands)
<li> "Head over Heels" (Trimpop/Frege) – 4:05 (from The Battle of the Bands)
<li> "La historia del pescador Pepe" (The story of Pepe the fisherman [in Spanish]) (Breitkopf, Frege, von Holst, Meurer, Trimpop/Frege) – 3:17 (from The Battle of the Bands)
<li> "Schöne Bescherung" (roughly Happy holidays; lit. Nice gift-giving, also Nice mess) (Breitkopf, Frege, von Holst, Meurer, Trimpop/Frege) – 2:23 (from The Battle of the Bands)
<li> "Vom Surfen und vom Saufen" (About surfing and about drinking) (Breitkopf/Frege) – 2:49 (from The Battle of the Bands)
<li> "Der Schandfleck" – 2:43 (Unter falscher Flagge demo)
 "Unter falscher Flagge" – 3:58 (Unter falscher Flagge demo)

Personnel
Campino - vocals
Andreas von Holst - guitar
Michael Breitkopf - guitar
Andreas Meurer - bass
Trini Trimpop - drums

References 

Die Toten Hosen albums
1984 albums
German-language albums
Virgin Records albums